Čabarkapa is a Serbo-Croatian surname, derived from a nickname meaning "bucket-cap" or "tub-cap". It is borne by ethnic Serbs. It may refer to:

Žarko Čabarkapa, basketballer
Boban Čabarkapa, footballer
Milenko Čabarkapa, chess player

Serbian surnames
Montenegrin surnames